X3 (pronounced "Triple") is Aya Matsuura's third album. It was released on January 1, 2004, and sold 110,874 copies. It contains three of her previously released singles, as well as a solo version of GET UP! Rapper that she originally sang as part of SALT5 and a remix of Yeah! Meccha Holiday. The album was certified gold by the Recording Industry Association of Japan.

Track listing
 
 
 
 
 
 
 "The Last Night"
 
 
 
 "LOVE TRAIN"

References

2004 albums
Aya Matsuura albums